Høvåg is a village in Lillesand municipality in Agder county, Norway. The village lies on the northern shore of the Kjerkekilen, a strait leading from the Blindleia to the Isefjorden. The village is the site of Høvåg Church and from 1865 until 1962, it was the administrative centre of the old municipality of Høvåg.

References

Villages in Agder
Lillesand